Khalid Mehsud (alias Khan Said Sajna) (1973 – 8 February 2018) was the deputy leader of the Tehrik-i-Taliban Pakistan and the leader of the Mehsud faction of the Taliban in South Waziristan, Pakistan. He was formerly the chief of Tehrik-i-Taliban Pakistan's South Waziristan chapter. Pakistani intelligence officials reported that he had been killed along with other 12 militants on 25 November 2015 in a drone strike carried out by the United States. Azam Tariq, spokesperson for the Sajna faction of TTP denied that he had been killed.
He was killed in a drone strike on 8 February 2018 in North Waziristan, near the border with Afghanistan.

History

He was born around 1973 in Dwa Toi village located between Makeen and Sara Rogha in Ladha subdivision, South Waziristan. He was a member of the Shabi Khel clan of Mehsud tribe. His father was named Malik Muhammad. Before he joined the TTP, he was studying in college and was part of the Tablighi Jamaat. Senator Saleh Shah of the Jamiat Ulema-e Islam (F) said, "He didn't even kill a bird in Pakistan. He was one of the people who never took funds from any other country to fight against the Pakistani state".

References

External links 
 

Tehrik-i-Taliban Pakistan
Tehrik-i-Taliban Pakistan members
Deaths by United States drone strikes in Pakistan
2018 deaths
1973 births